The R347 is a Regional Route in South Africa that connects Strydenburg with the R369 to Hopetown and Prieska. There was another unconnected route R347 located in Eastern Cape Province which has since been re-signed as the M25.

External links
 Routes Travel Info

References

Regional Routes in the Northern Cape